Ellen Mitchell, née Thomsen (born 1974) is a Norwegian handball player. She played 28 matches for the Norway women's national handball team from 1996 to 1998.  She participated at the 1996 European Women's Handball Championship, where the Norwegian team placed second, and at the 1997 World Women's Handball Championship, where Norway placed second.

Her clubs include Stabæk.

References

1974 births
Living people
Norwegian female handball players